"Irish Boy" is an instrumental piece from Mark Knopfler's 1984 soundtrack album, Cal, released on August 24, 1984. The piece is the first track off the album.

Personnel
 Mark Knopfler – guitars
 Paul Brady – tin whistle, mandolin
 Liam O'Flynn  – Uilleann pipes
 Guy Fletcher – keyboards
 John Illsley – bass
 Terry Williams – drums

She Loves Him Still

In 1984, American singer Stevie Nicks wrote and sang lyrics over Knopfler's instrumental and recorded a demo version of the song, called "She Loves Him Still," which was never released, but made its way into circulation among fans for many years. In 2014, Nicks re-recorded the song for her album 24 Karat Gold: Songs from the Vault

Personnel

Stevie Nicks – vocals
Waddy Wachtel – guitar
Sharon Celani – backing vocals
Lori Nicks – backing vocals
Michael Rhodes – bass
Chad Cromwell – drums
Benmont Tench – keyboards
Lenny Castro – percussion

References

External links
Stevie Nicks official site

1984 songs
Mark Knopfler songs
Stevie Nicks songs
Songs written by Mark Knopfler
Songs written by Stevie Nicks